Hakea pendens is a flowering plant in the family Proteaceae and endemic to a small area in the Goldfields-Esperance regions of Western Australia. It is a small shrub with needle-like leaves and pendulous pink flowers.

Description
The branchlets are densely covered in silky, flattened hairs until flowering and then the surface becoming whitish and waxy. The inflorescence is a cluster of 6-8 pale pink pendulous flowers borne in leaf axils.

Taxonomy and naming
Hakea pendens was first formally described in 1990 by Robyn Mary Barker and the description was published in the Journal of the Adelaide Botanic Garden from a specimen collected near Marvel Loch. The specific epithet (pendens) means "hanging down", referring to the flower.

Conservation status
Hakea pendens is classified as "Priority Three" by the Government of Western Australia Department of Parks and Wildlife meaning that it is poorly known and known from only a few locations but is not under imminent threat.

References

pendens
Eudicots of Western Australia
Plants described in 1990
Taxa named by Robyn Mary Barker